Tom, Dick and Hairy is a 1993 Hong Kong romantic comedy film directed by Lee Chi-ngai and Peter Chan and starring Tony Leung Chiu-wai, Tony Leung Ka-fai and Lawrence Cheng as the three titular protagonists.

Plot
Tom Chan, Dick Ching and his older cousin Hairy Mo live in the same tenement building but have different love lives. Tom and his girlfriend Joyce are totally harmonic, but nonetheless love has become feelings. Once, looking for lust in a nightclub, Tom meets a stunning PR girl, Cat. The two fall in love, but since Tom's wedding date is getting close, he needs to make a tough decision.

Dick is a playboy who often pursues sex without love. Sometimes at night without a pursuing object, he spends the night with Wai-fong.

At this point, Tom's younger sister, Pearl, returns to Hong Kong from the US and Dick feels lost of Pearl's passion. On the other hand, Dick realizes that he had always loved Wai-fong but she has gone elsewhere when he wants to express his love.

Hairy is a bachelor who meets a divorced man Michelle, who turns out to be a homosexual man. Later, Hairy dates a girl named Francis who strikingly resembles his idol Vivian Chow, something unexpected for this unbearably lonely man.

Cast
Tony Leung Chiu-wai as Tom Chan
Tony Leung Ka-fai as Dick Ching
Lawrence Cheng as Hairy / Giorgio Mo
Michael Chow as Michelle
Ann Bridgewater as Cat
Anita Yuen as Wai-fong
Jay Lau as Joyce Lau
Athena Chu as Pearl Chan
Vivian Chow as Francis
Jessica Hsuan as Woman at Restaurant With Dating Group
Kim Yip as Priest
Michael Wong as Man on ferry (cameo)
Wong Wai-kei as Dick's girlfriend 1 (model)
Yeung Qui-lee as Dick's girlfriend 2
Cheung Yin-kei as Dick's girlfriend 3 (Japanese girl)
Lau Chiu-fan as Producer
Kan Wai-yan as Bride
Leung Mei-yee as Bridesmaid
Sze Hiu-lung as Best Man
Lai Mei-ling as Bank teller
Simon Cheung as Cat's nightclub customer
Kwok Si-wing as Joyce's bridal gown tailor
Lo Wai-ling as Hairy's Blind Date 1
Vi Vi as Hairy's Blind Date 2
Cheng Wai-kit as Harry's Blind Date 3
Chow Tak-ming as Dating Company Staff
Teddy Chan as Man at Restaurant With Dating Group
Choi Yue-cheung as Man at Restaurant With Dating Group
Leung Kai-chi as Joyce's father
Matthew Link as French restaurant's waiter
Chan Siu-hung as Groom
Tse Chi-wah as Electronic goods mover
Leo as Street Painter
Yu Ngai-ho as Guest at Dick's Party
Hui Sze-man as Mamasan

Box office
The film grossed HK$17,064,766 at the Hong Kong box office during its theatrical run from 26 February to 26 March 1993 in Hong Kong.

Award nominations
13th Hong Kong Film Awards
Nominated: Best Film
Nominated: Best Director (Lee Chi-ngai, Peter Chan)
Nominated: Best Screenplay (James Yuen, Lee Chi-ngai, Chan Hing-ka)
Nominated: Best Supporting Actor (Lawrence Cheng)

External links

Tom, Dick and Hairy at Hong Kong Cinemagic

Tom, Dick and Hairy Review at LoveHKFilm.com

1993 films
1993 romantic comedy films
Hong Kong romantic comedy films
Hong Kong LGBT-related films
1990s Cantonese-language films
Films directed by Peter Chan
Films set in Hong Kong
Films shot in Hong Kong
Films with screenplays by James Yuen
Films directed by Lee Chi-ngai
1990s Hong Kong films